Aberdeen Clayhills Carriage Maintenance Depot is a stabling point located in Aberdeen, Scotland. The depot is situated on the Denburn Valley Line and is located near Aberdeen station. 

The depot code is AC.

History 
Before their withdrawal from the franchise at the end of 2019, the depot serviced London North Eastern Railway Class 43 High Speed Trains.

Present 
As of 2021, Clayhills depot is used for maintaining and stabling long distance locomotive hauled services, more specifically, ScotRail Class 43, High Speed Trains, their respective Mark 3 carriages,  Express Sprinters and Class 170 Turbostars.

References 

 Railway depots in Scotland